The Enhanced Tactical Multi-Purpose (ET-MP) is an American hand grenade designed by engineers at the US Army Combat Capabilities Development Command Armaments Center (CCDC-AC) at Picatinny Arsenal, New Jersey, announced in 2016. The electronically fuzed grenade could operate in either fragmentation or blast mode, selectable at time of use. It appears not to have been adopted or further developed; there have been no other articles written since 2017.

References

Hand grenades of the United States